Wilbur is a Canadian live-action/animated children's television series that first aired on the Ready Set Learn block on Discovery Kids in the United States on April 16, 2007, later moving to TLC starting on April 23, 2007, airing until March 21, 2008.

Produced by Mercury Filmworks in association with Chilco Productions, EKA Distribution and Egmont Imagination, it focuses on an anthropomorphic calf and his friends as they solve problems by reading books with each other. 26 episodes (52 segments) were produced.

Plot
Wilbur has an episode split into two shorts: at first, Wilbur and his friends would encounter a problem. After this, Wilbur gets a wiggling sensation which prompts him to read a book that guides the group in solving their problem. The book in question is usually wholly made up for the purposes of the show and features Wilbur and his friends. 

After the group discusses their problem and its resolution, they read through the short book a second time, with clips showing children reciting the line "Once upon a time" at the beginning and saying "The end" at the end of the story.

Characters
 Wilbur the Calf (voiced by Julie Lemieux) is an anthropomorphic calf and the main protagonist of the series.
 Dasha the Duck (voiced by Emma Pustil) is one of Wilbur's friends.
 Ray the Rooster (voiced by Ian Busher) is also one of Wilbur’s friends.
 Libby the Lamb (voiced by Taylor Barber) is a cute, younger lamb who seeks the others’ help to look after. She speaks with a toddler's lisp.

Episodes

Production
The franchise existed as a series of videotapes produced in 1997. A pilot for Wilbur was produced by Cuppa Coffee Studios in 2001.

References

External links
 

2007 Canadian television series debuts
2008 Canadian television series endings
2000s Canadian animated television series
2000s Canadian children's television series
Canadian children's animated fantasy television series
Canadian flash animated television series
Canadian television shows featuring puppetry
Canadian television series with live action and animation
Canadian preschool education television series
Animated preschool education television series
2000s preschool education television series
English-language television shows
Animated television series about children
Television series about cattle
Television series about ducks
Television series about chickens
Television series about sheep
Reading and literacy television series
TLC (TV network) original programming
Discovery Kids original programming